Chamanahalli  is a village in the southern state of Karnataka, India. It is located in the T Narasipura taluk of Mysuru district in Karnataka.

See also 
 Mysuru
 Mandya
 Districts of Karnataka

References

External links 

Villages in Mandya district